James Cerretani and Max Schnur were the defending champions, but decided not to participate this year.

Sam Groth and Adil Shamasdin won the title, defeating Matt Reid and John-Patrick Smith 6–3, 2–6, [10–8] in the final.

Seeds

Draw

References
Main Draw

Challenger Banque Nationale de Drummondville
Challenger de Drummondville